Per Dalin (19 November 1936 – 10 March 2010) was a Norwegian educationalist.

He was born in Oslo, took his master's degree in 1963 and the Ph.D. in 1973. He co-founded the International Movement Towards Educational Change in 1974, and was also director. He was also research director at OECD's Centre for Educational Research and Innovation, and an adjunct professor at the University of Oslo from 1994.

References

1936 births
2010 deaths
Academic staff of the University of Oslo
Norwegian educationalists